Proposition 12 ("Prop 12") was a California ballot proposition in that state's general election on November 6, 2018. The measure was self-titled the Prevention of Cruelty to Farm Animals Act.  The measure passed, by a vote of about 63% Yes to 37% No.

The proposition establishes new minimum requirements on farmers to provide more space for egg-laying hens, breeding pigs, and calves raised for veal. California businesses will be banned from selling eggs or uncooked pork or veal that came from animals housed in ways that did not meet these requirements.

The ballot measure aimed to build upon and strengthen the requirements of a previous ballot measure, the 2008 California Proposition 2, which prohibited battery cages and gestation crates for animals in California, and required that pigs, hens, and calves be able to spread their wings or limbs and turn around. The California legislature in 2010 passed AB 1437, which required all shell eggs sold in the state to meet the same requirements, including those produced elsewhere. Proposition 12 closed loopholes in these laws by requiring the same for all eggs and pork sold in the state, regardless of the form it was sold in (i.e. both shell eggs and liquid eggs), and the state where it was produced.

The egg industry has largely complied with the law. However, despite the resounding success at the ballot box, the pork industry unsuccessfully sued to block implementation of the law. In June 2021, the Supreme Court of the United States rejected a lawsuit from the North American Meat Institute to stop the law. The Meat Institute had argued that Prop 12 violated the Commerce Clause of the US Constitution, but this argument was rejected because Prop 12 holds in-state and out-of-state producers to the same standard. The law was implemented on January 1, 2022.

On January 25, 2022, a judge ordered a temporary halt to enforcement of the prohibition on pork from gestation crates, for 180 days, pending development of final regulations by the California Department of Food and Agriculture, to give producers more time to comply. The CDFA also needed more time to comply with a lawsuit filed by animal activists, who wanted to increase stringency of the regulations. The American Farm Bureau Federation and the National Pork Producers Council are again asking the Supreme Court to overturn the law, in another lawsuit similar to the ones that have previously been rejected.

Ballot Label summary
The California Secretary of State's summary from the Official Voter Information Guide of Proposition 12 is as follows:

"ESTABLISHES NEW STANDARDS FOR CONFINEMENT OF SPECIFIED FARM ANIMALS; BANS SALE OF NONCOMPLYING PRODUCTS. INITIATIVE STATUTE. Establishes minimum requirements for confining certain farm animals. Prohibits sales of meat and egg products from animals confined in noncomplying manner. Fiscal Impact: Potential decrease in state income tax revenues from farm businesses, likely not more than several million dollars annually. State costs up to $10 million annually to enforce the measure."

Supporters
Humane Society of the United States
ASPCA (American Society for the Prevention of Cruelty to Animals)
Mercy for Animals
The Humane League
Compassion in World Farming
Animal Legal Defense Fund
Animal Equality
Animal Protection and Rescue League (APRL)
Compassion Over Killing
In Defense of Animals (IDA)
San Francisco SPCA
San Diego Humane Society
Marin Humane Society
Center for Food Safety
Organic Consumers Association
Center for Biological Diversity
Sierra Club California
United Farm Workers
Farm Sanctuary
World Animal Protection
Animal Welfare Institute
California Animal Welfare Association

Newspapers supporting Prop 12:
Los Angeles Times
The Mercury News (San Jose)
The Monterey Herald
San Francisco Bay Guardian
East Bay Express
East Bay Times
Marin Independent Journal
San Diego Free Press
Santa Cruz Sentinel

Opponents
Association of California Egg Farmers
National Association of Egg Farmers
American Veal Association
California Pork Producers Association
People for the Ethical Treatment of Animals (PETA)
National Pork Producers Council
California Farm Bureau Federation
Protect the Harvest
Humane Farming Association
Friends of Animals
Showing Animals Respect and Kindness (SHARK)
Action for Animals

Newspapers opposing Prop 12:
The Bakersfield Californian
Los Angeles Daily News/The San Bernardino Sun
San Francisco Chronicle
The Fresno Bee/The Sacramento Bee
Orange County Register
The Press Democrat (Santa Rosa)
The San Diego Union-Tribune
The Tribune (San Luis Obispo)

Assertions by Proponents
The Humane Society of the United States (HSUS) and other animal protection groups argued that confining animals in small cages is cruel, and that Prop 12 was needed to improve animal welfare, including by mandating cage-free conditions for egg-laying hens. Prop 12 applies equally to both animals raised in California and those raised elsewhere for the California marketplace. Prop 12 was endorsed by the Center for Food Safety because research indicates that caging farm animals increases the spread of food-borne pathogens like Salmonella.

Assertions by Opponents
The American Veal Association argued that Prop 12 would create “unnecessary regulations” and that the veal industry is already well on its way to phasing out crates. Ken Klippen of the National Association of Egg Farmers told Fox News that the measure would take away consumer choice and that the motivation behind the measure was to push consumers towards a vegan diet.

Election results

The results of the vote were 62.65% YES to 37.35% NO.

See also
 List of California ballot propositions 2010–19
 List of California ballot propositions
 Elections in California
 California Proposition 2 (2008)

References

External links
 Text of Proposition 12
 Prevent Cruelty California – pro-proposition website
 Californians Against Cruelty, Cages, and Fraud – anti-proposition website
 Prop 12 page in California Secretary of State's website
 California Proposition 12, Farm Animal Confinement Initiative (2018) at Ballotpedia
 Treatment of animals on the ballot at Ballotpedia

2018 California ballot propositions
Agriculture in California
Animal welfare and rights legislation in the United States
Initiatives in the United States
United States agricultural policy